Sunset & Vine, Sunset & Vine, or Sunset and Vine may refer to:

Sunset+Vine, the sports division of U.K. production company Tinopolis
 The intersection of Sunset Boulevard and Vine Street in Hollywood, Los Angeles, California
 A shopping center/luxury apartment complex co-funded by Magic Johnson Enterprises

Music
 Sunset and Vine, a 2005 album by British band Shy
 "Sunset & Vine", a song by The Charlatans from the 2006 album Simpatico
 a song by Waylon Jennings from the 1967 album Waylon Sings Ol' Harlan